A furphy is Australian slang for an erroneous or improbable story that is claimed to be factual. Furphies are supposedly heard from reputable sources, sometimes secondhand or thirdhand, and widely believed until discounted. The word is said to derive from water carts designed and made by a company established by John Furphy of J. Furphy & Sons of Shepparton, Victoria. The steel and cast iron tanks were first made in the 1880s and were used on farms and by stock agents. Many Furphy water carts were used to take water to Australian Army personnel during World War I in Australia, Europe and the Middle East. 

In his book Memories of a Signaller, Harold Hinckfuss wrote of the "furphies" or rumours of pending movements of troops, while awaiting transfer to the French lines from Egypt. "Every day in the tent someone would come up with a 'furphy' that he had heard whilst down at the latrines. That is why the different stories were called furphies ('furphy' was the term used for a fart)."

See also
Scuttlebutt

References

Further reading
 The Australian National Dictionary Centre, "Aussie words FURPHY"
 "Furphy", languagehat.com
 "furphy", Encarta

External links
 J. Furphy & Sons official website
 Furphy Foundry official website
 furphystory.com.au

Australian English
Australian slang
Australian Army
Water supply infrastructure
Australian brands
Military terminology